Over Drive is a Japanese manga series written and illustrated by Yasuda Tsuyoshi. It was serialized in Kodansha's shōnen manga magazine Weekly Shōnen Magazine from May 2005 to May 2008, with its chapters collected in 17 tankōbon volumes. A 26-episode anime television series, produced by Xebec and directed by Takao Kato, was broadcast from April to September 2007. The story revolves around the first year high school student Mikoto Shinozaki and his goal to become the greatest cyclist in the world and winning the Tour de France.

Plot
The story begins with a flashforward to the Tour de France, where Mikoto Shinozaki would become the first Japanese champion. Time before this, and while feeling a deep crush on Yuki Fukazawa, Mikoto then decides to get into a high school cycling club as Fukuzawa's suggestion, even though he has never practiced any sport before. The club's leader is Yōsuke, Fukuzawa's older brother and a renowned road racer from his town. Yōsuke's long time cycling partner and club's vice president Kouichi Terao sees in Shinozaki all the potential and courage necessary to become a road cycling legend. Mikoto Shinozaki becomes interested in cycling and all the ups and downs he must live to get his dream of becoming Tour de France's champion come true.

Characters

A first-year student and the third member of the schools cycling club. Originally living a quiet boring life and getting bullied daily by the upperclassmen until one day when Yuki Fukazawa asks him to join the school's cycling club. Though he rejects this proposal at first as he, due to a childhood trauma he has forgotten, finds bicycles to be scary and thus he also does not remember how to ride one, but wanting to impress Yuki, he tries to train in secret and during this (short) time he starts to actually like bicycles. One thing leading to the other he ends up joining the club in the end and vows to become the greatest cyclist in the world.

3rd year student and the captain of the schools cycling club and is a bit of a fanatic when it comes to it. Like his sister he also likes to play tricks on people but mostly to Mikoto. One example is when Koichi explained why cyclists need to shave their legs and when Mikoto said he wanted to do the same Yosuke shaved them but along with his pubic hair as well. Has been bicycle racing since his early childhood, though not very much liked by his teammates as no one was able to keep up with him. The exception being his friend Kōichi. Both Yōsuke and Kōichi ended up leaving the cycling club and later on started their own.

Childhood friend of Yōsuke and founder of the schools cycling club. He has the position of secondary captain. He is known as a "secret machine" due to the way he researches every small detail about the race conditions and major contenders. Because of this, he is the only one who can bring out Yōsuke's full power. He often mentions that he think Mikoto is very cute and also admires his strength and spirit which is capable of being a true cyclist.

Classmate, friend and fellow club member of Mikoto. He is 15 years old and is known as Kurosuke, a nickname which he dislikes, when out cycling because of his all-black clothing. Has previously lived in Spain. He is a climbing specialist.

First-year student and Mikoto's big crush. She is Yōsuke's sister. She was the one that introduced Mikoto into the cycling world. She can be very manipulative and bossy to everyone around her and is prone to hitting them when she feels like it which is Mikoto for the most part. She also has the habit of taking embarrassing pictures of everyone but mostly Mikoto. At first Yuki could not really care less about Mikoto and his crazy antics, but her opinion began to change when she saw how dedicated he could be. Even though she was starting to see Mikoto in a different light she refused to admit this to others and herself.

A girl in the same class as Mikoto. From a rich family, sponsors of a race. After seeing Mikoto riding, she starts to admire him and asks to join the bike club.

Maki is one of Yuki's longtime best friends. Unlike the other two, Maki is a little calmer and more sensible. She does a lot with her friends and even accompanies Yuki to events like the cycling tournament, in which Mikoto and Yuki's brother Yōsuke take part.

Father of Kōichi and the team manager. His wife left him long ago because of his obsession with bikes. Owns a bicycle shop, Terao's Cycling Shop.

Media

Manga
Written and illustrated by Yasuda Tsuyoshi, Over Drive was serialized in Kodansha's shōnen manga magazine Weekly Shōnen Magazine from May 11, 2005, to May 14, 2008. Kodansha collected its chapters in 17 tankōbon volumes, released from September 16, 2005, to June 17, 2008.

Anime
A 26-episode anime television series adaptation, produced by Xebec and directed by Takao Kato, was broadcast on TV Tokyo, TVA, TVO from April 4 to September 26, 2007.

Episode list

Notes

References

External links
 Manga official website 
 Over Drive anime  at TV Tokyo 
 Over Drive anime at Xebec 
 

Cycling in anime and manga
Kodansha manga
Shōnen manga
TV Tokyo original programming
Xebec (studio)